Albarado is a surname. Notable people with the surname include:

Oscar Albarado (1948–2021), American boxer
Robby Albarado (born 1973), American jockey

See also
Alvarado (surname)

English-language surnames